Boq is a character in The Wonderful Wizard of Oz.

BOQ may stand for:

 Bachelor Officer Quarters, which are buildings on U.S. Military bases for quartering commissioned officers (as opposed to BEQ (Bachelor Enlisted Quarters) used by enlisted personnel).
 Bank of Queensland, an Australian bank headquartered in Brisbane, Queensland
 Bitter Old Queen, humorous gay slang
 Bill of quantities, a term used in quantity surveying